HMCS Cape Breton is a name used by several ships of the Royal Canadian Navy:

 , River-class frigate launched in 1942
 , Cape-class maintenance ship named in 1952

Battle honours

 Atlantic, 1941–45
 Normandy, 1944
 English Channel, 1944–45

References

 Government of Canada Ships' Histories - HMCS Cape Breton

Royal Canadian Navy ship names